Planaxis savignyi is a species of sea snail, a marine gastropod mollusk in the family Planaxidae.

Description
The length of the shell attains 17 mm.

Distribution
It is found in the Red Sea.

References

 Brocchi, G. B. (1821). Catalogo di una serie di conchiglie raccolte presso la costa africana del golfo Arabico dal sig. G. Forni. Biblioteca Italiana, ossia Giornale di letteratura scienze ed arti. 24: 73-86, 209-226.
 Dautzenberg, Ph. (1923). Liste préliminaire des mollusques marins de Madagascar et description de deux espèces nouvelles. J. conchyliol. 68: 21-74

External links
 Deshayes, G. P. (1844). G. Planaxis. Lamarck. P. savignyi. Deshayes. Magasin de Zoologie. ser. 2, 6: pl. 109.
 Katsanevakis, S.; Bogucarskis, K.; Gatto, F.; Vandekerkhove, J.; Deriu, I.; Cardoso A.S. (2012). Building the European Alien Species Information Network (EASIN): a novel approach for the exploration of distributed alien species data. BioInvasions Records. 1: 235-245
 Janssen, R.; Zuschin, M. & Baal, C. (2011). Gastropods and their habitats from the northern Red Sea (Egypt: Safaga). Part 2: Caenogastropoda: Sorbeoconcha and Littorinimorpha. Annalen des Naturhistorischen Museum Wien, ser. A. 113: 373-509.

Planaxidae
Gastropods described in 1844